Panchina d'Oro is a yearly award given to the best Italian association football coaches of the Serie A. The Golden Bench is also awarded to the best men's Serie C and women's Serie A coaches as well as the best coaches in men's Italian futsal. The Panchina d'Argento is awarded to the best Serie B and women's Serie B coach as well as the best coaches in women's Italian futsal.

History
The award was originally conceived by Massimo Moratti to reward the best European football club managers. While the award was initially assigned by journalists, from the 1993–94 season it started to be awarded by manager themselves to the colleagues considered to have performed the best throughout the previous season.

From 1994–95 to 2005-06, the Golden Bench was awarded to the best Serie A or Serie B manager and the Silver Bench to the best Serie C1 or Serie C2 managers.

From the 2006–07 season, the Golden Bench is awarded to the best Serie A manager and the Silver Bench to the best Serie B manager. A new category was therefore added to reward managers from the third (Serie C1/Prima Divisione) and fourth (Serie C2/Seconda Divisione) tier of the Italian football league system. After the third and fourth tiers were unified in 2015, a single Golden Bench is awarded to the best Serie C manager.

In the 2013–14 edition, the award was opened to Italian's women football, celebrating the best women's Serie A and Serie B coaches. In the 2016–17 edition, the award was also opened to the best coaches in men's and women's Italian futsal.

Recipients

List of men's football Gold and Silver Bench winners

List of Serie C Gold and Silver Bench winners

List of women's football Gold and Silver Bench winners

List of futsal Gold and Silver Bench winners

Other awards

Special Golden Bench

Lifetime Achievement Golden Bench

Special Award for Enhancing Young Players

"Positive Message" Award

"Mino Favini" Award

Footnotes

References

External links 
  Recipients of the Panchina d'Oro until 2008–09 on Alleniamo.com

Serie A trophies and awards
Awards established in 1991